SourceForge is a web service that offers software consumers a centralized online location to control and manage open-source software projects and research business software. It provides source code repository hosting, bug tracking, mirroring of downloads for load balancing, a wiki for documentation, developer and user mailing lists, user-support forums, user-written reviews and ratings, a news bulletin, micro-blog for publishing project updates, and other features.

SourceForge was one of the first to offer this service free of charge to open-source projects. Since 2012, the website has run on Apache Allura software. SourceForge offers free hosting and free access to tools for developers of free and open-source software.

, the SourceForge repository claimed to host more than 502,000 projects and had more than 3.7 million registered users.

Concept 
SourceForge is a web-based source code repository. It acts as a centralized location for free and open-source software projects. It was the first to offer this service for free to open-source projects. Project developers have access to centralized storage and tools for managing projects, though it is best known for providing revision control systems such as CVS, SVN, Bazaar, Git and Mercurial.  Major features (amongst others) include project wikis, metrics and analysis, access to a MySQL database, and unique sub-domain URLs (in the form http://project-name.sourceforge.net).

The vast number of users at SourceForge.net (over 3 million as of 2013) exposes prominent projects to a variety of developers and can create a positive feedback loop. As a project's activity rises, SourceForge.net's internal ranking system makes it more visible to other developers through SourceForge directory and Enterprise Directory. Given that many open-source projects fail due to lack of developer support, exposure to such a large community of developers can continually breathe new life into a project.

Revenue model 
SourceForge's traditional revenue model is through advertising banner sales on their site. In 2006 SourceForge Inc. reported quarterly takings of US$6.5 million. In 2009 SourceForge reported a gross quarterly income of US$23 million through media and e-commerce streams.  In 2011 a revenue of US$20 million was reported for the combined value of the SourceForge, slashdot and freecode holdings, prior to SourceForge's acquisition.

Since 2013 additional revenue generation schemes, such as bundleware models, have been trialled, with the goal of increasing SourceForge's revenue. The result has in some cases been the appearance of malware bundled with SourceForge downloads. On February 9, 2016, SourceForge announced they had eliminated their DevShare program practice of bundling installers with project downloads.

Negative community reactions to the partnership program led to a review of the program, which was nonetheless opened up to all SourceForge projects on February 7, 2014. The program was canceled by new owners BIZX, LLC on February 9, 2016;

On May 17, 2016, they announced that it would scan all projects for malware and display warnings on downloads.

History
SourceForge, founded in 1999 by VA Software, was the first provider of a centralized location for free and open-source software developers to control and manage software development and offering this service without charge. The software running the SourceForge site was released as free software in January 2000 and was later named SourceForge Alexandria.  The last release under a free license was made in November 2001; after the dot-com bubble, SourceForge was later powered by the proprietary SourceForge Enterprise Edition, a separate product re-written in Java which was marketed for offshore outsourcing.

SourceForge has been temporarily banned in China three times: in September 2002, in July 2008 (for about a month) and on August 6, 2012 (for several days).

In November 2008, SourceForge was sued by the French collection society Société civile des Producteurs de Phonogrammes en France (SPPF) for hosting downloads of the file sharing application Shareaza.

In 2009 SourceForge announced a new site platform known as Allura, which would be an extensible, open source platform licensed under the Apache License, utilizing components such as Python and MongoDB, and offering REST APIs. In June 2012 the Allura project was donated to the Apache Software Foundation as Apache Allura.

In September 2012 SourceForge, Slashdot, and Freecode were acquired from Geeknet by the online job site Dice.com for $20 million, and incorporated into a subsidiary known as Slashdot Media. In July 2015 Dice announced that it planned to sell SourceForge and Slashdot, and in January 2016 the two sites were sold to the San Diego-based BIZX, LLC for an undisclosed amount. In December 2019, BIZX rebranded as Slashdot Media.

On September 26, 2012, it was reported that attackers had compromised a SourceForge mirror, and modified a download of phpMyAdmin to add security exploits.

Controversies
Some of SourceForge's monetization practices have been met with criticism by developers and end users.

DevShare adware

In July 2013 SourceForge announced that it would provide project owners with an optional feature called DevShare, which places closed-source ad-supported content into the binary installers and gives the project part of the ad revenue. Opinions of this new feature varied; some complained about users not being as aware of what they are getting or being able to trust the downloaded content, whereas others saw it as a reasonably harmless option that keeps individual projects and users in control.

In November 2013 GIMP, a free image manipulation program, removed its download from SourceForge, citing misleading download buttons that potentially confuse customers, as well as SourceForge's own Windows installer, which bundles potentially unwanted programs. In a statement, GIMP called SourceForge a "once useful and trustworthy place to develop and host FLOSS applications" that now faces "a problem with the ads they allow on their sites ..."

In response to the DevShare adware many users and projects migrated to GitHub, other software hosting facilities, or self-host their software. In May 2015, SourceForge took control of pages for five projects that had migrated to other hosting sites and replaced the project downloads with adware-laden downloads. Community concerns triggered a prompt review of SourceForge mirroring program, and third-party bundling of mirrored content was discontinued on May 27, 2015.

After SourceForge was sold to BizX in 2016, DevShare was discontinued. On May 17, 2016, SourceForge announced that they were now scanning all projects for malware, and displaying warnings on projects detected to have malware.

Project hijackings and bundled malware
GIMP, who discontinued their use of SourceForge as a download mirror in November 2013, reported in May 2015 that SourceForge was hosting versions of their Windows binaries that "put other software apart from GIMP on our users' systems" on their Open Source Mirror directory, which SourceForge claims is a collection of abandoned projects. This came despite SourceForge's commitment in November 2013 to never bundle adware with project downloads without developers' consent. GIMP said "To us, this firmly places SourceForge among the dodgy crowd of download sites."

On June 1, 2015, SourceForge claimed that they had stopped coupling "third party offers" with unmaintained SourceForge projects. Since this announcement was made, a number of other developers have reported that their SourceForge projects had been taken over by SourceForge staff accounts (but have not had binaries edited), including nmap, and VLC media player.
On June 18, 2015, SourceForge announced that SourceForge-maintained mirrored projects were removed, and anticipated the formation of a Community Panel to review their mirroring practices. No such Community Panel ever materialized, but SourceForge ended the bundling of installers after new ownership took over in early 2016.

Project of the Month 
Since 2002, SourceForge has featured a pair of Projects of the Month, one chosen by its community and the other by its staff, but these have not been updated since December 2020.

Reception

Usage
, the SourceForge repository hosted more than 300,000 projects and had more than 3 million registered users, although not all were active. The domain sourceforge.net attracted at least 33 million visitors by August 2009 according to a Compete.com survey.

Country restrictions 

In its terms of use, SourceForge states that its services are not available to users in countries on the sanction list of the U.S. Office of Foreign Assets Control (including Cuba, Iran, North Korea, Sudan and Syria). Since 2008 the secure server used for making contributions to the site has blocked access from those countries. In January 2010, the site had blocked all access from those countries, including downloads. Any IP address that appeared to belong to one of those countries could not use the site. By the following month, SourceForge relaxed the restrictions so that individual projects could indicate whether or not SourceForge should block their software from download to those countries. This, however, had been reversed by November 2020 for North Korea and other countries. Crimea has been blocked since February 1, 2015.

See also

 Comparison of source code hosting facilities

References

External links

 
 "The SourceForge Story", by James Maguire (2007-10-17)

Free software websites
Geeknet
Internet properties established in 1999
Internet services supporting OpenID
Open-source software hosting facilities